Hamburg Township is a civil township of Livingston County in the U.S. state of Michigan.  As of the 2010 census, the township population was 21,165. It is the most populated municipality in Livingston County.

Communities 
A trio of unincorporated communities exist within the township:

The Hamburg ZIP code, 48139, serves a small area in the southeast part of the township. E.F. Gay, a merchant from Ann Arbor, bought  here in 1835 and built a dam and sawmill. He sold out in 1837 to three Germans known as the Messrs. Grisson, who added a grist mill, store, and hotel. A plat was recorded in 1837. Nineteen men met to choose a name for the town. The three Germans were not allowed to vote and the others deadlocked 8–8, split between naming it "Steuben" or "Knox". The others finally agreed to allow the Messrs. Grisson to decide, and they choose the name of their hometown, Hamburg, Germany.
Named for its location in a series of lakes, a post office was established in May 1903. The Lakeland ZIP code, 48143, provides P.O. Box service.
Pettysville is at Pettysville and Rush Lake roads.

Zip Code areas
 Brighton is to the northeast, and the Brighton ZIP code, 48116, serves northeastern areas of Hamburg Township.
 Howell is to the northwest, and the Howell ZIP code, 48843, serves some of the northwestern portion of Hamburg Township.
 Pinckney is to the west, and the Pinckney ZIP code, 48169, serves much of the western portion of Hamburg Township.
 Whitmore Lake is to the southeast, and the Whitmore Lake ZIP code, 48189, serves a portion in the southeast of Hamburg Township.

Geography
Hamburg Township is in southeastern Livingston County and is bordered to the south by Washtenaw County. State highway M-36 crosses the township, passing through Lakeland and Hamburg, and leading east  to U.S. Route 23 at Whitmore Lake and west the same distance to Pinckney.

There are 32 named lakes, with numerous smaller ponds, marshes, creeks and streams. The township is part of the Huron River watershed. The river passes through the eastern and southern parts of the township as it flows toward Lake Erie.

Parks/Lakelands Trail/Brighton State Recreation Area
East and West Bennett Parks off Merrill Road serve the recreational needs of township children for soccer, football, cheerleading, and softball.

Five miles of Lakelands Trail State Park have been developed through Hamburg Township, with the easternmost terminus of the trail located in the township. The trail is asphalted and parallels the state highway M-36. It is a favorite place of township residents for walking and bicycling. No motorized vehicles are permitted on the Lakelands Trail.

Just over an entire section (Section 10) of Hamburg Township contains a significant portion of the Brighton State Recreation Area. Rustic and modern campsites are available. There is a swimming beach and boat launch for Bishop Lake, together with numerous picnic areas, barbecue facilities and hiking trails.

Demographics
As of the census of 2000, there were 20,627 people, 7,086 households, and 5,796 families residing in the township. The racial makeup of the township was 97.22% White, 1.02% African American, 0.28% Native American, 0.44% Asian, 0.03% Pacific Islander, 0.19% from other races, and 0.82% from two or more races. Hispanic or Latino of any race were 1.14% of the population.

There were 7,086 households, out of which 43.8% had children under the age of 18 living with them, 73.7% were married couples living together, 5.3% had a female householder with no husband present, and 18.2% were non-families. 13.9% of all households were made up of individuals, and 3.5% had someone living alone who was 65 years of age or older.  The average household size was 2.88 and the average family size was 3.20.

In the township the population was spread out, with 29.6% under the age of 18, 5.5% from 18 to 24, 34.1% from 25 to 44, 24.5% from 45 to 64, and 6.3% who were 65 years of age or older.  The median age was 36 years. For every 100 females, there were 103.8 males.  For every 100 females age 18 and over, there were 103.8 males.

The median income for a household in the township was $75,960, and the median income for a family was $81,351. Males had a median income of $56,671 versus $34,111 for females. The per capita income for the township was $30,283.  About 1.5% of families and 2.4% of the population were below the poverty line, including 2.9% of those under age 18 and 4.2% of those age 65 or over.

References

External links
Hamburg Township official website

Townships in Livingston County, Michigan
Townships in Michigan